The Frauen-Bundesliga 1992–93 was the 3rd season of the Frauen-Bundesliga, Germany's premier football league. It was the last time games were played over 80 minutes (2 x 40). In the final TuS Niederkirchen defeated TSV Siegen to win their first title.

Northern conference

Standings

Results

Southern conference

Standings

Results

Semifinals

Final

Top scorers

Qualification

Group North

Group South 1

Group South 2

References

1992-93
Ger
1
Women